The 1947 Giro d'Italia was the 30th edition of the Giro d'Italia, organized and sponsored by the newspaper La Gazzetta dello Sport.

The Giro was won by Fausto Coppi of the Bianchi team, with fellow Italians Gino Bartali and Giulio Bresci coming in second and third respectively.

Teams

A total of twelve teams entered the 1947 Giro d'Italia. Each team sent a squad of seven riders, so the Giro began with a peloton of 84 cyclists. Out of the 84 riders that started this edition of the Giro d'Italia, a total of 50 riders made it to the finish in Milan.

The teams entering the race were:

Cozzi-Silger 
Legnano
Lygie 
Olmo 
Monterosa 

Wally

Route and stages

Race overview

In the fifteenth stage, Bartali dismounted his bike to punch a spectator who shouted an anti-Catholic slur at him. He then continued to win the stage.

Classification leadership

The leader of the general classification – calculated by adding the stage finish times of each rider – wore a pink jersey. This classification is the most important of the race, and its winner is considered as the winner of the Giro.

In the mountains classification, the race organizers selected different mountains that the route crossed and awarded points to the riders who crossed them first.

There was a black jersey (maglia nera) awarded to the rider placed last in the general classification. The classification was calculated in the same manner as the general classification.

The winner of the team classification was determined by adding the finish times of the best three cyclists per team together and the team with the lowest total time was the winner. If a team had fewer than three riders finish, they were not eligible for the classification.

The rows in the following table correspond to the jerseys awarded after that stage was run.

Final standings

General classification

Mountains classification

Team classification

Minor awards

Coppi won the blue bracelet for winning the stage with the greatest time between the second placed rider. He managed to achieve a gap of 4' 24" during the stage from Pieve di Cadore to Trento, where he won by a margin of 4' 24". Coppi and Adolfo Leoni split the "premato veloce" classification which was given to the rider with the most stage wins. Leoni and Coppi both won three stages, while four riders won two stages.

References

Citations

Bibliography

 
1947
Giro d'Italia
Giro d'Italia
Giro d'Italia
Giro d'Italia